Everybody Loves a Lover is an album by jazz organist Shirley Scott recorded for the Impuse! label in 1964 and performed by Scott with Stanley Turrentine, Bob Cranshaw and Otis Finch. The album has not appeared on CD yet, but the first three tracks were released on the CD reissue of Turrentine's Let it Go.

Reception

The Allmusic review by awarded the album 3 stars.

Track listing
All compositions by Shirley Scott except as indicated
 "Sent for You Yesterday (And Here You Come Today)" (Count Basie, Eddie Durham, Jimmy Rushing) - 5:38 
 "The Lamp Is Low" (Peter DeRose, Mitchell Parish, Maurice Ravel, Bert Shefter) - 8:04 
 "The Feeling of Jazz" (Duke Ellington, George T. Simon, Bobby Troup) - 4:16 
 "Everybody Loves a Lover" (Richard Adler, Robert Allen) - 8:00       
 "Little Miss Know It All" - 4:26      
 "Shirley" - 4:30      
 "Blue Bongo" (Bob Hammer, Bob Thiele) - 3:10
Recorded on September 21, 1964 (1-4) and September 23, 1964 (5-7).

Personnel
Shirley Scott - organ 
Stanley Turrentine - tenor saxophone (tracks 1-6)
Bob Cranshaw - bass
Otis Finch - drums
Howard Collins, Barry Galbraith - guitar (tracks 5-7)
Willie Rodriguez - percussion (tracks 5-7)

Production
 Bob Thiele - producer
 Rudy Van Gelder - engineer

References

1966 albums
Shirley Scott albums
Impulse! Records albums
Albums produced by Bob Thiele
Albums recorded at Van Gelder Studio